The large fly subfamily Limoniinae is paraphyletic and presently contains about 150 genera:

Acantholimnophila Alexander, 1924
Achyrolimonia Alexander, 1965
Adelphomyia Bergroth, 1891
Afrolimnophila Alexander, 1956
Amphilimnobia Alexander, 1920
Amphineurus Skuse, 1890
Antocha Osten-Sacken, 1860
Aphrophila Edwards, 1923
Araucoxenia Alexander, 1969
Arctoconopa Alexander, 1955
Atarba Osten-Sacken, 1869
Atypophthalmus Brunetti, 1911
Austrolimnophila Alexander, 1920
Aymaramyia Alexander, 1943
Baeoura Alexander, 1924
Bergrothomyia Alexander, 1928
Beringomyia Savchenko, 1980
Cheilotrichia Rossi, 1848
Chilelimnophila Alexander, 1968
Chionea Dalman, 1816
Cladura Osten-Sacken, 1860
Clydonodozus Enderlein, 1912
Collessophila Theischinger, 1994
Conosia van der Wulp, 1880
Crypteria Bergroth, 1913
Cryptolabis Osten-Sacken, 1860
Ctenolimnophila Alexander, 1921
Dactylolabis Osten Sacken, 1860
Dapanoptera Westwood, 1881
Dasymallomyia Brunetti, 1911
Degeneromyia Alexander, 1956
Dicranomyia Stephens, 1829
Dicranoptycha Osten-Sacken, 1860
Diemenomyia Alexander, 1928
Discobola Osten-Sacken, 1865
Edwardsomyia Alexander, 1929
Elephantomyia Osten-Sacken, 1860
Elliptera Schiner, 1863
Ellipteroides Becker, 1907
Eloeophila Rondani, 1856
Empedomorpha Alexander, 1916
Epiphragma Osten-Sacken, 1860
Erioconopa Stary, 1976
Erioptera Meigen, 1803
Eriopterella Alexander, 1929
Eriopterodes Alexander, 1970
Eugnophomyia Alexander, 1947
Euphylidorea Alexander, 1972
Eupilaria Alexander, 1932

Eutonia van der Wulp, 1874
Geranomyia Haliday, 1833
Gnophomyia Osten-Sacken, 1860
Gonempeda Alexander, 1924
Gonomyia Meigen, 1818
Gonomyodes Alexander, 1948
Grahamomyia Alexander, 1935
Gymnastes Brunetti, 1911
Gynoplistia Westwood, 1835
Harrisomyia Alexander, 1923
Helius Lepeletier and Serville, 1828
Hesperoconopa Alexander, 1948
Heterolimnophila Alexander, 1924
Hexatoma Latreille, 1809
Hoplolabis Osten-Sacken, 1869
Horistomyia Alexander, 1924
Hovamyia Alexander, 1951
Hoverioptera Alexander, 1963
Idiocera Dale, 1842
Idiognophomyia Alexander, 1956
Idioptera Macquart, 1834
Ilisia Rondani, 1856
Jivaromyia Alexander, 1943
Lechria Skuse, 1890
Lecteria Osten-Sacken, 1888
Leolimnophila Theischinger, 1996
Libnotes Westwood, 1876
Limnophila Macquart, 1834
Limnophilella Alexander, 1919
Limnophilomyia Alexander, 1921
Limnorimarga Alexander, 1945
Limonia Meigen, 1803
Lipsothrix Loew, 1873
Maietta Alexander, 1929
Medleromyia Alexander, 1974
Mesolimnophila Alexander, 1929
Metalimnobia Matsumura, 1911
Metalimnophila Alexander, 1922
Molophilus Curtis, 1833
Neocladura Alexander, 1920
Neognophomyia Alexander, 1926
Neolimnomyia Seguy, 1937
Neolimnophila Alexander, 1920
Neolimonia Alexander, 1964
Neophilippiana Alexander, 1964
Nippolimnophila Alexander, 1930
Notholimnophila Alexander, 1924
Nothophila Alexander, 1922
Orimarga Osten-Sacken, 1869
Ormosia Rondani, 1856
Paradelphomyia Alexander, 1936
Paralimnophila Alexander, 1921
Phantolabis Alexander, 1956
Phylidorea Bigot, 1854
Phyllolabis Osten-Sacken, 1877
Pilaria Sintenis, 1889
Platylimnobia Alexander, 1917
Polymera Wiedemann, 1821
Prionolabis Osten-Sacken, 1860
Prolimnophila Alexander, 1929
Protohelius Alexander, 1928
Pseudolimnophila Alexander, 1919
Quathlambia Alexander, 1956
Quechuamyia Alexander, 1943
Rhabdomastix Skuse, 1890
Rhamphophila Edwards, 1923
Rhipidia Meigen, 1818
Rhypholophus Kolenati, 1860
Riedelomyia Alexander, 1928
Scleroprocta Edwards, 1938
Shannonomyia Alexander, 1929
Sigmatomera Osten Sacken, 1869
Skuseomyia Alexander, 1924
Styringomyia Loew, 1845
Symplecta Meigen, 1830
Taiwanina Alexander, 1928
Taiwanomyia Alexander, 1923
Tasiocera Skuse, 1890
Tasiocerellus Alexander, 1958
Teucholabis Osten-Sacken, 1860
Thaumastoptera Mik, 1866
Thrypticomyia Skuse, 1890
Tinemyia Hutton, 1900
Tipulimnoea Theischinger, 1996
Tonnoiraptera Alexander, 1935
Tonnoirella Alexander, 1928
Tonnoiromyia Alexander, 1926
Toxorhina Loew, 1850
Trentepohlia Bigot, 1854
Trichoneura Loew, 1850
Trichotrimicra Alexander, 1921
Ulomorpha Osten-Sacken, 1869
Unguicrypteria Alexander, 1981
Xenolimnobia Alexander, 1926
Zaluscodes Lamb, 1909
Zelandomyia Alexander, 1923

References 

 

 List
Limoniinae